The 1st Conference of the 6th Season of the Philippines Shakey's V-League will start on April 19 at the Filoil Flying V Arena. Teams include defending champion and current NCAA champion San Sebastian, UAAP runner-up FEU, NCRAA champion Lyceum. Two Visayan teams, CESAFI champion USJ-R, and USLS, join at the quarterfinals. UAAP champion La Salle decided not to compete and took a leave of absence; UP replaced the Lady Archers to complete the eight-team elimination round roster.

Tournament format
A revised tournament format was issued with 10 teams participating:
Elimination round: Round robin
Top four teams will qualify for quarterfinals.
Bottom four will be eliminated from contention.
Quarterfinals: Round robin
Standings are reset back to zero.
Top four teams from the elimination round will be joined by the University of San Jose-Recoletos Lady Jaguars and University of St. La Salle Lady Stingers.
Top four teams will qualify for semi-finals
Bottom two teams are eliminated for a semi-finals berth.
Semi-finals: Best-of-three series
 #1 vs. #4
 #2 vs. #3
Finals: Best-of-three series
 Championship: Winners of the semi-finals
 Bronze match: Losers of the semi-finals
 In case the championship series ends first, and the two teams split the series, the team with which has won the greater number of sets wins third place

NOTE: This format is official as set by the Shakey's V-League.

Starting Line-ups

Elimination round

Team standings

SW = sets won; SL = sets lost

Results
Important note: All teams played all of their opponents only once.

Exhibition game

Fourth-seed playoff

Adamson advances to quarterfinals; Ateneo is eliminated.

Quarterfinals

Team standings

Results

Bracket

Semifinals

UST–FEU series

UST leads series 1–0

Series tied 1–1

UST wins series 2–1

San Sebastian–Adamson series

SSC-R leads series 1–0

SSC-R wins series 2–0

Finals

Bronze series

Adamson leads series 1–0

Adamson wins series 2-0

Championship series

SSC-R leads series 1–0

Series tied 1–1

UST wins series 2–1

Final ranking
Champion - 
1st runner-up - 
2nd runner-up - 
3rd runner-up -

Awards
Best Scorer:  Jaroensri Bualee (SSC-R)
Best Attacker:  Laurence Ann Latigay (SSC-R)
Best Blocker:  Aiza Maizo (UST)
Best Setter:  Rhea Katrina Dimaculangan (UST)
Best Digger:  Lizlee Ann Gata (Adamson)
Best Server:  Macaila Irish May Morada (FEU)
Best Receiver:  Margarita Pepito (SSC-R)
Most Improved Player:  Shaira Gonzalez (FEU)
Conference MVP:  Mary Jean Balse (UST)
Finals MVP:  Rhea Katrina Dimaculangan (UST)

References

External links
Official website

Shakey's V-League conferences
2009 in volleyball
2009 in Philippine sport